Malliabad is 5 km from Raichur, it has historical fort and monuments.
Excavation site os Archaeological Department, research, conservation and restoration works are in progress, seeking help from Kannada University Hampi.

Malliabad Fort
The Malliabad fort is important in the history of Raichur and North Karnataka. 
A ruined Vishnu temple and a pair of life sized elephants carved in white granite are located in the fort, the State Department of Archaeology declared as a protected historical monument.
The fort was built during the 13th Century (1294 A.D) by the Kakatiyas of Warangal and also associated with the Vijayanagar Empire.
In 1520 A.D.Krishnadevaraya stayed here along with his army during the Battle of Raichur against Adilshahis.

Life sized elephants
Two life sized elephants carved in white granite were found in the Malliabad Fort and these are under the supervision of Government authorities. 
The elephants are from the period of the Vijayanagar Empire. Initially the elephants were placed in front of the Vishnu temple, and once adorned the gateway of the Malliabad Fort.

See also
Forts of Karnataka
North Karnataka
Kakatiyas 
Raichur

References

Forts in Karnataka
Buildings and structures in Raichur district